The War of the Oxen is a 1920 German silent historical film directed by Franz Osten. It was made by Bavaria Film at the company's Munich studios. It is based on the 1914 novel The War of the Oxen by Ludwig Ganghofer.

Cast
 Thea Steinbrecher as Jula
 Fritz Greiner
 Carl Dalmonico
 Lia Eibenschütz
 Fritz Kampers
 Ernst Rückert
 Katharina Schratt
 Thelma Votipka

References

Bibliography
 Goble, Alan. The Complete Index to Literary Sources in Film. Walter de Gruyter, 1999.

External links 
 

1920 films
1920s historical films
German historical films
Films of the Weimar Republic
German silent feature films
Films directed by Franz Osten
Films set in Bavaria
Films set in the Holy Roman Empire
Films set in the 1420s
Films based on German novels
Films based on works by Ludwig Ganghofer
German black-and-white films
Films set in the Alps
Bavaria Film films
Films shot at Bavaria Studios
1920s German films